The Clearwater River is  located in the Canadian provinces of Saskatchewan and Alberta. It rises in the northern forest region of north-western Saskatchewan and joins the Athabasca River in north-eastern Alberta. It was part of an important trade route during the fur trade era and has been designated as a Canadian Heritage River.

Course
It flows south-eastward from its headwaters at Broach Lake and turns to the south-west from Careen Lake to the Alberta / Saskatchewan border. The section of the river in Fort McMurray is affectionately referred to as the Chant.

Its waters eventually reach the Arctic Ocean via the Athabasca and Mackenzie Rivers. Tributaries of the Clearwater River include Descharme River and McLean River in Saskatchewan and the Christina River in Alberta.

Geology

In its upper reaches, the Clearwater River flows over the Precambrian rocks of the Canadian Shield. That section of the river is rough, characterized by rapids, small waterfalls, and a gorge. The river leaves the Shield near the Alberta border and enters the Interior Plains where it  becomes meandering, with numerous sand bars and small islands. There it is flanked by outcrops of the Devonian limestones, dolomite, and shales of the La Loche, Contact Rapids, Keg River, and Waterways Formations, as well as the Cretaceous oil sands of the McMurray Formation.

The Clearwater River is an underfit stream; that is, its present flow is insufficient to have carved its broad, steep-sided valley. Instead, its morphology may be the result of a catastrophic paleoflood that originated from Glacial Lake Agassiz during late Pleistocene time and flowed through the Clearwater and Athabasca river valleys on its way to the Arctic Ocean.  The channel cut by that flood is known as the Clearwater Spillway.

There are several salt springs and saline marshes that discharge into the Clearwater River in northeastern Alberta. The water, which comes from the underlying Devonian rock formations, is effervescent in places and smells of sulfur.

History

Rock-paintings  along the upper portion of the river, shapes and symbols on rock surfaces, suggest that the area was already inhabited 5,000 years ago. Before the  European colonisation, native groups of Beaver, Chipewyan, and Cree people lived in the Clearwater River area.

During European exploration and the fur trade of the 18th century, the lower  Clearwater River was part of an important canoe route  between Hudson Bay and Montreal in the east, and the District of Athabasca in the west. The rough Precambrian upper portion of the Clearwater River was a barrier to the traders until 1778, when explorer Peter Pond crossed the Methye Portage to bypass it. Methye Portage extended between Lac La Loche and the Clearwater River, forming a  overland link on the route from Churchill, Manitoba to Athabasca, Alberta. For almost 40 years, this was the only overland connection for the fur trade in the region, and it continued in use for most of the 19th century.

Fish species
The river's fish species include: walleye, yellow perch, northern pike, lake trout, Arctic grayling, lake whitefish, cisco, white sucker, longnose sucker and burbot.

Conservation

Provincial park
The province of Saskatchewan has established the Clearwater River Provincial Park, encompassing an area of 865 mi2; or 2240 km2, to protect the river's environment.

Canadian Heritage Rivers System
The Saskatchewan section was granted Canadian Heritage River status  because of its "unspoiled, clear-water river in a pristine" isolated "wilderness setting of spectacular beauty".

Regional Aquatics Monitoring Program (RAMP)
The Regional Aquatics Monitoring Program (RAMP) uses the Clearwater River as a "baseline river system" to provide "information on the variability and characteristics of natural systems".  Although natural outcrops of McMurray Formation oil sands are present along the river, the "lack of significant oil sands developments" within its watershed allows it to be used as a baseline.

See also
List of rivers of Alberta
List of rivers of Saskatchewan
Athabasca oil sands

References

External links
 Map of the river's course from Canadian Heritage Rivers System
 Fish Species of Saskatchewan
 Encyclopedia of Saskatchewan
 Clearwater River Provincial Park

Rivers of Alberta
Rivers of Saskatchewan
Canadian Heritage Rivers